Don't Throw That Knife is a 1951 short subject directed by Jules White starring American slapstick comedy team The Three Stooges (Moe Howard, Larry Fine and Shemp Howard). It is the 131st entry in the series released by Columbia Pictures starring the comedians, who released 190 shorts for the studio between 1934 and 1959.

Plot
The Stooges are census takers strolling through an apartment complex when they come upon a woman called Mrs. Lucy Wyckoff (Jean Willes). The Stooges learn that Wyckoff is one-half of a husband-and-wife Magician Troupe who perform regularly. Unfortunately, Mr. Wyckoff (Dick Curtis) is also an evil man-hating jealous husband and a precise knife thrower who kills any perverted men who talks to his wife. When Mr. Wyckoff comes home, the Stooges make a failed effort to take cover. After several frightening threats, the trio depart as fast as their feet will carry them as they scoot out and get the cops on their little scooters.

Cast
 Shemp Howard as Shemp
 Larry Fine as Larry
 Moe Howard as Moe
 Jean Willes as Lucy Wyckoff
 Dick Curtis as Mr. Wycoff

Production notes
"Don't Throw That Knife" was filmed on June 20–22, 1950. The film title is officially listed with quotation marks around it (as in "Don't Throw That Knife").

Author Michael Fleming noted that "Don't Throw That Knife" was the first effort by director Jules White that was a truly poor entry in the series. White had been alternating with Edward Bernds to direct the Stooges' films, with Bernds' efforts having a noticeable polish that White was beginning to lack. By the following year, a power struggle at Columbia Pictures broke out, resulting in the departure of both Bernds and producer Hugh McCollum. This left White as the sole director of the Stooges films from late 1952 to 1957 when the trio's contract with the studio expired.

References

External links
 
 
 "Don't Throw That Knife" at threestooges.net

1951 films
The Three Stooges films
American black-and-white films
Films directed by Jules White
1951 comedy films
Columbia Pictures short films
American comedy short films
1950s English-language films
1950s American films